Zahl is an unincorporated community in northwestern Williams County, North Dakota, United States.  It lies along North Dakota Highway 50 north of the city of Williston, the county seat of Williams County.  Its elevation is 2,014 feet (614 m).  It has a post office with the ZIP code 58856.

History 
A post office called Zahl has been in operation since 1905. The community bears the name of F. R. Zahl, an early settler.

Climate 
This climatic region is typified by large seasonal temperature differences, with warm to hot (and often humid) summers and cold (sometimes severely cold) winters.  According to the Köppen Climate Classification system, Zahl has a humid continental climate, abbreviated "Dfb" on climate maps.

References 

Unincorporated communities in Williams County, North Dakota
Unincorporated communities in North Dakota